Inflammasomes are cytosolic multiprotein oligomers  of the innate immune system responsible for the activation of inflammatory responses. Activation and assembly of the inflammasome promotes proteolytic cleavage, maturation and secretion of pro-inflammatory cytokines interleukin 1β (IL-1β) and interleukin 18 (IL-18), as well as cleavage of Gasdermin-D. The N-terminal fragment resulting from this cleavage induces a pro-inflammatory form of programmed cell death distinct from apoptosis, referred to as pyroptosis,  and is responsible for secretion of the mature cytokines, presumably through the formation of pores in the plasma membrane.

Inflammasome activation is initiated by different kinds of cytosolic pattern recognition receptors (PRRs) that respond to either microbe-derived pathogen-associated molecular patterns (PAMPs) or damage-associated molecular patterns (DAMPs) generated by the host cell. Pattern recognition receptors involved in inflammasomes comprise NLRs (nucleotide-binding oligomerization domain and leucine-rich repeat-containing receptors) as well as AIM2 (absent in melanoma 2), IFI16 (IFN-inducible protein 16 ) as well as pyrin. Through their caspase activation and recruitment domain (CARD) or pyrin domain (PYD), the inflammasome receptors interact with the adaptor protein ASC, which then recruits pro-caspase-1 via its CARD domain and activates the effector caspase through proteolytic cleavage. The activated caspase-1 finally cleaves the immature pro-inflammatory cytokines pro-IL-1β and pro-IL-18, as well as Gasdermin-D, which are responsible for inflammatory signaling and pyroptotic cell death, respectively. In addition to these so-called canonical inflammasomes, different studies also described non-canonical inflammasome complexes that act independently of caspase-1. In mice, the non-canonical inflammasome is activated by direct sensing of cytosolic bacterial lipopolysaccharide (LPS) by caspase-11, which subsequently induces pyroptotic cell death. In human cells, the corresponding caspases of the non-canonical inflammasome are caspase 4 and caspase 5.

Traditionally, inflammasomes have mainly been studied in professional immune cells of the innate immune system, such as macrophages. More recent studies, however, indicate high levels of inflammasome component expression in epithelial barrier tissues, where they have been shown to represent an important first line of defense.

In the case of dysregulation of inflammasome activation, an assortment of major diseases, such as cancer, autoimmune, metabolic and neurodegenerative diseases may arise.

Discovery 

The inflammasome was discovered by the team of Jürg Tschopp, at the University of Lausanne, in 2002. Tschopp and team were able to articulate the inflammasome's role in diseases such as gout and type 2 diabetes. They found that a variety of danger signals could provoke a response from an inflammasome including viral DNA, muramyl dipeptide (MDP), asbestos, and silica. Tschopp and his colleagues found a connection between metabolic syndrome and NLRP3, a subset type of inflammasome. Within their research on NLRP3, they were able to show that when NLRP3 is inhibited, an immunosuppressive behavior of type I interferon was exhibited. Ultimately, the work of Tschopp and his team led to the research and eventual treatments of many major diseases and ailments. In 2002, it was first reported by Martinon et al. that a subset of NLRs named NLRP1 were able to assemble and oligomerize into a common structure which collectively activated the caspase-1 cascade, thereby leading to the production of pro-inflammatory cytokines especially IL-1B and IL-18. This NLRP1 multi-molecular complex was dubbed the ‘inflammasome’, which spurred much interest in the following years; since then, several other inflammasomes were discovered, two of which are also NLR subsets—NLRP3 and NLRC4.

In 2009, Hornung et al. classified an inflammasome of the PYHIN (pyrin and HIN domain-containing protein) family, termed absent in melanoma 2 (AIM2) which assembles upon sensing foreign cytoplasmic double-stranded DNA (dsDNA). Notably, the pyrin domain of the adaptor protein ASC has recently been shown to function as a prion-like domain, through a self-perpetuating manner upon activation.

Inflammation activation 
The inflammasome activates a pyroptotic inflammatory cascade. Once active, the inflammasome binds to pro-caspase-1 (the precursor molecule of caspase-1), either homotypically via its own caspase activation and recruitment domain (CARD) or via the CARD of the adaptor protein ASC which it binds to during inflammasome formation. In its full form, the inflammasome appositions together many p45 pro-caspase-1 molecules, inducing their autocatalytic cleavage into p20 and p10 subunits. Caspase-1 then assembles into its active form consisting of two heterodimers with a p20 and p10 subunit each.

Once active, it can then carry out a variety of processes in response to the initial inflammatory signal. These include the proteolytic cleavage of pro-IL-1β at Asp116 into IL-1β, cleavage of pro-IL-18 into IL-18, as well as cleavage of Gasdermin-D to release its N-terminal fragment responsible for the induction of pyroptosis, an immunostimulatory form of programmed cell death in which the cell releases its cytoplasmic content to induce pro-inflammatory signaling. IL-1β  and IL-18 released following inflammasome activation were found to induce IFN-γ secretion and natural killer cell activation, cleavage and inactivation of IL-33, DNA fragmentation and cell pore formation, inhibition of glycolytic enzymes, activation of lipid biosynthesis and secretion of tissue-repair mediators such as pro-IL-1α. Additionally, AIM2 contains a HIN200 domain which senses and binds foreign cytoplasmic dsDNA and activates NF-κB, a role that is crucial in bacterial and viral infection.

Inflammasome family 

NLRP1, NLRP3, NLRP6 and NLRC4 are subsets of the NLR family and thus have two common features: the first is a nucleotide-binding oligomerization domain (NOD) which is bound by ribonucleotide-phosphates (rNTP) and is important for self-oligomerization. The second is a C-terminal leucine-rich repeat (LRR), which serves as a ligand-recognition domain for other receptors (e.g. TLR) or microbial ligands. NLRP1 has been found in neurons, while both NLRP3 and NLRC4 (IPAF) have been identified in microglial cells.

Apoptosis-associated speck like protein containing a caspase recruitment domain (ASC or Pycard) plays a key role in activation of the inflammasome. ASC helps recruit caspase-1 to associate with NLRs in the inflammasome complex via its CARD domain.

ASC also has duties independent of the inflammasome as it has been shown to be required for MHC class II to present antigenic peptides in dendritic cells.

NLRP1 inflammasome 
In addition to NOD and LRR, NLRP1 contains at its N-terminal a pyrin domain (PYD) and at its C-terminus an FIIND motif and a CARD, which distinguishes it from the other inflammasomes. While there is only one NLRP1 protein present in humans, rodents were found to have different paralogues. Upon activation, the C-terminal CARD homotypically interacts with the CARD of procaspase-1 or procaspase-5, while its N-terminal PYD homotypically interacts with the PYD of adaptor protein ASC, whose CARD can then recruit another pro-caspase-1. The overall recruitment and cleavage of procaspase-1 can then activate all downstream caspase-1 pathways.

NLRP1B in mice and NLRP2 in rats were found to be responsive to Bacillus anthracis lethal toxin. The B. anthracis lethal factor proteolytically cleaves NLRP1B, which leads to ubiquitination of the receptor and targeting for degradation by the proteasome. This degradation generates a clipped C-terminal fragment, that subsequently binds to the rest of the protein in a non-covalent manner. During this process, a CARD on the C-terminal fragment becomes accessible for inflammasome assembly. So far, this activation mechanism depending on degradation by the proteasome machinery is unique among inflammasomes.

NLRP1 activity is regulated by anti-apoptotic proteins Bcl-2 and Bcl-x(L) which, in resting cells, associate with and inhibit NLRP1 activity.

NLRP3 inflammasome 
In addition to the NOD and LRR domains, NLRP3 contains a PYD domain like NLRP1 and thus activates caspase-1 the same way, using its PYD to recruit ASC. It forms only one oligomer per cell, and its oligomer is made of seven NLRP3 molecules. It is known to be the biggest inflammasome of all, covering about 2 um in diameter.

NLRP3 oligomerization is activated by a large number of stimuli, including both PAMPs and DAMPs, which has implicated studies into its activation pathway.  Examples of such stimuli from the DAMP group are crystalline matter such as monosodium urate (MSU) crystals, alum or asbestos, calcium influx, mitochondrial reactive oxygen species (ROS), and extracellular ATP. The NLRP3 inflammasome was also found to respond to PAMPs of different pathogens, such as viruses, e.g. influenza A, bacteria, e.g. Neisseria gonorrhoeae, and bacterial toxins e.g. nigericin and maitotoxin.

All NLRP3 activators induce cytosolic potassium efflux from cells and a sufficiently low cytosolic potassium concentration is capable of triggering NLRP3 activation in the absence other activators. Hence, the downstream point where all the different NLRP3 stimuli converge appears to be low intracellular potassium concentrations. NLRP3 inflammasome activation by cholesterol crystals and MSU crystals increase NLRP3-induced IL-1β-production and this process is thought to be abrogated in atherosclerosis and gout, where these crystals form in the cell. It has also been proven that inorganic particles like titanium dioxide, silicon dioxide and asbestos can trigger activation of the inflammasome. One study even indicates that NLRP3 inflammasome activation is involved in sleep regulation. Recent studies show that NLRP3 inflammasome-mediated neuroinflammation is involved in secondary brain injury after intracerebral hemorrhage.

The major endogenous product of lipid peroxidation, 4-hydroxynonenal, directly bound to NLRP3 and inhibited the NLRP3 inflammasome activation independently of Nrf2 and NF-κB signaling

NAIP/NLRC4 inflammasome
NLRC4 is the subset of the NLRC family to form an inflammasome and contains only a CARD domain in addition to the NOD and LRR, which it uses to recruit the adaptor protein ASC or pro-caspase-1 directly.

The NAIP/NLRC4 inflammasome is involved in host defense. In mouse, NAIPs are activated by binding to the bacterial PAMPs in the cytosol, given by the rod (NAIP2) and needle (NAIP1) components of the bacterial type-3 secretion system (T3SS), as well as flagellin, the molecular building block of flagella (NAIP5 and 6). In humans, there is only one NAIP, and it responds only to needle component. Following ligand binding, NAIPs interact with NLRC4 to initiate the assembly of the NAIP/NLRC4 inflammasome, which then recruits and activates pro-caspase-1 via its CARD domain.

Palmitate has been shown experimentally to induce the NLRC4 inflammasome without any bacteria present.

The NAIP/NLRC4 inflammasome is the best described epithelial inflammasome and plays an important role in the restriction of intraepithelial bacterial populations during early stages of enterobacterial infection with e.g. Salmonella and Citrobacter rodentium. Intracellular bacteria trigger activation of the inflammasome, which results in specific expulsion of infected epithelial cells from the epithelium in order to reduce the bacterial loads. This process is also referred to as epithelial cell extrusion, and occurs without compromising the integrity of the epithelial barrier. Furthermore, the NAIP/NLRC4 inflammasome was found to reduce tumor loads in a mouse model of colorectal carcinoma (CRC), by triggering the removal of tumor-initiating cells.

AIM2 inflammasome
Main article: AIM2

The AIM2 inflammasome is a detector of cytosolic double stranded DNA (dsDNA) and plays an important role in the coordination of immune defense to DNA virus infections, as well as intracellular bacterial infections. AIM2 is activated by viral dsDNA, bacterial dsDNA and also aberrant host dsDNA., and consequently it has been linked to different human diseases. For example autoinflammation in psoriasis disease was found to be connected to recognition of self-DNA by AIM2. Furthermore, activation of the AIM2 is supposed to play role in autoimmune responses during the autoimmune disease systematic lupus erythematosus. The AIM2 inflammasome is also activated by pharmacological disruption of nuclear envelope integrity. AIM2 binds dsDNA with its C-terminal HIN-200 domain. The PYDdomain of AIM2 homotypically interacts by PYD-PYD interactions with ASC. The ASC CARD domain recruits pro-caspase-1 into the complex. Caspase-1 activates maturation of proinflammatory cytokines (IL-1β, IL-18).

IFI16 inflammasome
Like AIM2, IFI16 (IFN-inducible protein 16) belongs to the PYHIN (pyrin and HIN domain-containing) family. IFI16 in humans, and IFI204 the mouse orthologue, play an important role in regulating the production of IFN during both bacterial and viral infections. In contrast to AIM2, IFI16 is a nuclear DNA sensor. Following interaction with viral DNAs, IFI16 was shown to recruit caspase-1 through interaction with ASC, resulting in cell death of CD4+ T cells in response to HIV infection.

Pyrin 
Assembly of the pyrin inflammasome is triggered by bacterial toxins as well as effector proteins via the detection of pathogen-driven disturbances in cytoskeleton dynamics. More specifically, pyrin detects inactivation of the Rho GTPase RHOA by these bacterial factors. Following detection of RHOA inactivation, pyrin interacts with ASC through its N-terminal PYD domain to induce activation of caspase-1.

Non-canonical inflammasomes 
The non-canonical inflammasomes are independent of caspase-1. In mice, the non-canonical inflammasome is dependent on caspase-11, whereas human non-canonical inflammasomes rely on caspase 4 and caspase 5. All of these caspases are able to directly bind intracellular LPS and subsequently form macromolecular complexes mediating Gasdermin-D cleavage and induction of pyroptotic cell death.

In addition, non-canonical inflammasomes may also indirectly activate the NLRP3 inflammasome by triggering potassium efflux through membrane pores formed by Gasdermin-D. The NLRP3 inflammasome can then mediate processing of pro-inflammatory cytokines and result in release of IL-1β and IL-18 in response to non-canonical inflammasome activation.

Role in health

Role in innate immunity 
As part of the innate immune system, inflammasomes play an important role in the induction of inflammatory cascades and coordination of host defenses, both via the activation and secretion of pro-inflammatory cytokines and the induction of a specialized form of immune-stimulatory programmed cell death termed pyroptosis. Inflammasomes and their components can also be involved in PANoptosis, a unique form of inflammatory cell death that cannot be individually accounted for by pyroptosis, apoptosis, or necroptosis alone.

In addition to professional cells of the innate immune system such as macrophages, several studies described various epithelial inflammasomes and highlighted their crucial role as a first line of defense. Considering the importance of epithelia as common pathogen entry sites as a result of their location at the interface to the environment, it seems intuitive that epithelial tissues do not merely fulfill a function as a physical barrier, but additionally initiate a defensive response upon initial contact with the pathogen. In agreement with this, different inflammasome components were found to be expressed in a variety of epithelial tissues. Expression of innate immune components at epithelial barriers furthermore facilitates pathogen detection given that expression of virulence factors and hence exposure of PAMPs is required for the breaching of these barriers during invasion, whereas these factors might be downregulated when the pathogen interacts with professional immune cells at later stages of infection. Epithelial inflammasomes have mainly been studied in the intestinal mucosa, but there is also evidence for inflammasomes in other types of epithelial such as the urinary bladder epithelium.

While the murine caspase-11 is mainly expressed in macrophages, human caspase-4 is also expressed at high levels in intestinal epithelial cells. Similar to what was observed for the epithelial NAIP/NLRC4 inflammasome, human epithelial cells were shown to undergo caspase-4-dependent, caspase-1-independent cell death and extrusion in response to infection with the enteropathogens such as Salmonella, Shigella flexneri or Escherichia coli. Furthermore, secretion of IL-18 could be triggered by cytosolic LPS in epithelial cells.

Role of epithelial inflammasome
Activation of epithelial inflammasomes in response to invading pathogens has important cell-autonomous effects on the infected cell itself as well as on its communication with other cell types on a local and global level. These downstream consequences of inflammasome activation can be divided into three categories, namely (1) death of the epithelial cell itself, (2) release of soluble pro-inflammatory molecules, and (3) effector cell recruitment and activation. In addition, epithelial inflammasome activation induces contraction of epithelial layers and prevents integrity loss at later stages of infection.

In order to maintain the integrity of the epithelial barrier, cell death and subsequent extrusion of the infected cell have to occur in a coordinated manner to ensure sealing of the gap in the epithelium by neighboring cells. Epithelial cell death can be triggered in a direct, cell-autonomous manner by inflammasome activation itself, as well as by local recruitment of other death-inducing cell types, or global inflammation, resulting in increased epithelial turnover that removes both infected and uninfected cells. The most important consequence of epithelial cell death is the reduction of epithelial pathogen loads in order to maintain barrier integrity.

Inflammasome activation is known to trigger cleavage, activation and secretion of pro-inflammatory IL-1β and IL-18, which then recruit different types of effector cells and coordinate the innate immune response. Expression of pro-IL-1β is dependent on Toll-like-receptor signaling, and hence intestinal epithelial cells produce very low levels of IL-1β themselves. Pro-IL-18, on the other hand, is constitutively expressed by different kinds of epithelial cells, and readily secreted upon inflammasome activation. The IL-18 secreted by the epithelium can induce production of IFN-γ by different cell types.

Importantly, inflammasome-derived IL-18 is also involved in recruitment of natural killer (NK) cells, that play a crucial role at early stages of innate immune responses. Furthermore, IL-18 can also stimulate the effector functions of NK cells that accumulated at the site of infection. The activated NK cells can then help in restricting the pathogen loads and spread to systemic sites at later time points compared to epithelium-autonomous induction of cell death. Finally, NK cells also secrete IFN-γ in order to recruit other inflammatory cell types.

In a study of UPEC infection of the urinary bladder epithelium, epithelial cells were found to secrete IL-1β at high levels in response to bacterial infection. The study reported IL-1β secretion to be dependent on the NLRP3 inflammasome and caspase-1, and the secreted pro-inflammatory cytokine was required for recruitment of mast cells to the site of infection. The mast cells then induce a lytic form of cell death in the epithelium by secreting granules that are taken up by the epithelium.

Besides NK cells and mast cells, neutrophils are other important innate immune effector cells that infiltrate the infected tissue after breaching of epithelial barriers by pathogens. Both IL-1β and IL-18 secreted in response to inflammasome activation are involved in the recruitment of neutrophils. Once they have reached the infected tissue, the neutrophils assist in immobilizing and eliminating the invading pathogens, whereby they either directly engulf or kill invading microbes. Furthermore, they secrete inflammatory mediators such as IFN-γ and IL-22. IFN-γ is known to drive activation of microbicidal capacity of mononuclear phagocytes. IL-22, on the other hand, will strengthen the epithelial barrier. Finally, neutrophils are responsible for the elimination of bacteria that are trapped within pyroptotic macrophages.

Role in disease 
Problems with regulating inflammasomes have been linked to several autoimmune diseases such as type I and type II diabetes, inflammatory bowel disease (IBD), gouty arthritis, multiple sclerosis, and vitiligo as well as auto-inflammatory disorders.

Gain-of-function mutations in inflammasome components are also known to cause Cryopyrin-associated periodic syndrome (CAPS), a group of congenital diseases characterised by IL-1β-mediated systemic inflammation.

Clinical significance
There has been some progress in the development of NLRP3 inhibitors some include: dapansutrile, and diarylsulfonylurea MCC-950.

References

Further reading 

 
 
 
 
    
  
 
 
 

Protein complexes
Cytokines